Georgia Lancaster (born 7 December 1995) is a British people female acrobatic gymnast. With partners Elise Matthews and Millie Spalding. Lancaster trained as an acrobatic gymnast for over 13 years, competing both nationally and internationally. She started off training at Spelthorne Gymnastics Club and later moved to Heathrow Gymnastics Club. Lancaster was British Champion three times, over the years of 2010, 2011 and 2013 - twice as a Women's Pair (with partner Megan Garraghan) and once in a Women's Group, alongside Matthews and Spalding. The trio achieved gold in the 2014 Acrobatic Gymnastics World Championships held in Levallois, Paris - becoming the first Great Britain trio to win the Senior World Championships in history.

Upon retiring from gymnastics aged 18 Georgia pursued a sales career, now working for Ezoic - based in Newcastle-upon-Tyne, England.

References

External links
 

1993 births
Living people
British acrobatic gymnasts
Female acrobatic gymnasts
Medalists at the Acrobatic Gymnastics World Championships
21st-century British women